Mehraneh Mahintorabi  (born 11 August 1957 in Karaj, Alborz province, Iran) is an Iranian actress. She gained popularity for her portrayal of Mahin in TV series, "Hamsaraan (Spouses)" and her role as Atefeh in "Khaneye Sabz (The Green House)".

Early life and education
Mahintorabi is the fourth of five siblings. She has received her bachelor's degree in acting and directing from University of Tehran, Faculty of Fine Arts.

Career
She started her career as an actress by playing a role in a play named "Taleh (Trap)" in 1977. Her debut in cinema was in Golbahar(1986)" and her first TV appearance was in Mash Kheyrollah, Sandoghcheye Asrar (1991).Movies and seriesEverything is there (2014)Zamaneh (2013)Atashbas 2 (2014)Love is not Closed (2014)Shamsol-emarehCrimes and MisdemeanorsNargess (TV series)In the Strand of Zayandeh Rud'' (TV series)

See also
Behnoosh Tabatabaei
Behnoosh Bakhtiari

References

People from Karaj
1957 births
Iranian film actresses
Iranian television actresses
21st-century Iranian actresses
Living people